Clinton, South Australia is a town and a locality in South Australia.

Clinton, South Australia may also refer:

Clinton Conservation Park,  a protected area
Clinton National Park, the former name of the Clinton Conservation Park
District Council of Clinton, a former local government area which was merged with others to create the District Council of Central Yorke Peninsula
Hundred of Clinton, a cadastral unit

See also
Clinton (disambiguation)
Clinton Centre, South Australia